The Presentation of the Virgin at the Temple is a 1534–1538 painting by Titian. It depicts the three year-old Virgin Mary entering the Temple of Jerusalem. It was commissioned by the fraternity based in the Scuola Grande di Santa Maria della Carita, a building later incorporated into the Galleria dell'Accademia, where the work now hangs.

Between 2010 and 2012, the non-profit organization Save Venice Inc. funded the conservation treatment of the painting. It was removed from the wall and taken to the Misericordia restoration lab in Venice. The restoration took two years and the work was done by conservators Giulio Bono and Erika Bianchini. In 2013, the project was named an Italian Heritage Award Winner of the International Prize for the Valorization of Italian Cultural Heritage, specifically awarded the First Prize for Painting Restoration.

Bibliography 
 Cecilia Gibellini, Tiziano, Milan, Rizzoli, coll. « I Classici dell'arte », 2003.
 Francesco Valcanover, L’opera completa di Tiziano, Milan, Rizzoli, 1969.
 Stefano Zuffi, Tiziano, Milan, Mondadori Arte, 2008 
 Marion Kaminski, Tiziano, Cologne, Könemann, 2000 
 Sheila Hale, Titian: His Life, HarperCollins, 2012, pp. 392-395

References

1538 paintings
Religious paintings by Titian
Titian
Paintings in the collection of the Galleria dell'Accademia